A frasilah is a historical weight unit that was used in the 19th century on the island of Zanzibar and in eastern Africa. This weight unit was used mainly by the Arabs involved in the ivory trade to weigh the mass of elephant tusks and other goods used in the trade, such as beads, cloth and brass wire. In 1871, a frasilah of ivory could be purchased inland for 20 US$ (around 500 US$ in 2011) in goods and sold in Zanzibar for about 60 US$ (around 1 500 US$ in 2011).

Sources 

 How I Found Livingstone: Travels, Adventures and Discoveries in Central Africa: Including an Account of Four Months' Residence with Dr. Livingstone by Sir Henry Morton Stanley 
 The Journal of the Royal Geographical Society, Volume 29 By Royal Geographical Society 
 The Lake Regions of Central Africa: A Picture of Exploration By Sir Richard Francis Burton 

Units of mass